The 1912 Vanderbilt Commodores football team represented Vanderbilt University in the 1912 college football season. The 1912 season was Dan McGugin's ninth year as head coach. Members of the Southern Intercollegiate Athletic Association (SIAA), the Commodores won their third straight conference title this year, posting an 8–1–1 win–loss–tie record (3–0–1 SIAA). The team played its home games at Dudley Field. It used the short punt formation as its offensive scheme.

Vanderbilt outscored its opponents 391–19. The team posted seven shutout victories, being scored upon in only three games. The team's only loss came to national champion Harvard. The Commodores also played to a tie with the Auburn Tigers.

Several players received postseason honors. Halfback and team captain Lewie Hardage was selected a third-team All-American by Walter Camp, the fourth player from the South ever to receive such recognition, and was a unanimous first-team All-Southern selection. Center Hugh Morgan, end Enoch Brown, tackle Tom Brown, fullback Ammie Sikes, and guard Herman Daves also received All-Southern recognition.

Before the season
Vanderbilt faced its hardest schedule to date. The team lost several varsity letter winners  to graduation, including quarterback Ray Morrison, tackle Ewing Y. Freeland, and guards Charles H. Brown and Will Metzger. Aside from Morrison, Vanderbilt retained the rest of its  backfield of the previous year, then voted best in the South by the Atlanta Constitution. It included halfbacks Lew Hardage (the team's captain) and Wilson Collins and fullback Ammie Sikes. Replacing Morrison at quarterback was renowned drop kicker Zach Curlin.

The 1912 season saw the NCAA implement several rule changes to increase scoring. These included: the value of a touchdown increased from 5 points to 6, the length of the field was reduced to 100 yards, 10-yard end zones were added, the onside kick was eliminated, and unlimited use of the forward pass was introduced.

Schedule

Season summary

Bethel
Future Vanderbilt star Josh Cody played for Bethel.

The game began at 3:30 p.m. in pouring rain. Wilson Collins began the scoring when he took a punt 45 yards down the right sideline for a touchdown.  Substitute quarterback Rabbi Robins was better suited to the mud than starter Zach Curlin. At one point during the game, Robins returned a kick 70 yards for a touchdown. Collins had five touchdowns, Enoch Brown three, Hardage, Robins and Morrison two each, and Reyer and Chester one each.

The starting lineup for Vanderbilt was: Turner (left end), Covington (left tackle), Daves (left guard), Morgan (center), Huffman (right guard), T. Brown (right tackle), E. Brown (right end), Curlin (quarterback), Hardage (left halfback), Collins (right halfback), and Sikes (fullback).

Maryville

Sources:

The Commodores then won by a 100–3 score against the Maryville Scots. Despite the first two games being like practice games, the large scores were a surprise, for in both  the substitutes replaced the regulars by the second quarter. Maryville's Badgett scored on a 31-yard field goal in the fourth quarter. One of Vanderbilt's scores was a 40-yard forward pass from Hardage to Brown.

The starting lineup for Vanderbilt was: Turner (left end), Covington (left tackle), Daves (left guard), Morgan (center), Huffman (right guard), T. Brown (right tackle), E. Brown (right end), Curlin (quarterback), Hardage (left halfback), Collins (right halfback), and Sikes (fullback).

Rose Polytechnic

Sources:

The game with Rose Polytechnic was seen as the first real test of the season. The Commodores still managed a 54–0 victory, with substitutes replacing the regulars by the end of the first half. The first score came on a 35-yard interception return by Lew Hardage.

During the game's opening drive, Rose Poly tried a trick play with a player in civilian clothes and satchel receiving the ball. He was caught by Vanderbilt defenders before he reached his own 30-yard line.

The starting lineup for Vanderbilt was: Turner (left end), Shipp (left tackle), Daves (left guard), Morgan (center), Swofford (right guard), T. Brown (right tackle), E. Brown (right end), Robins (quarterback), Hardage (left halfback), Collins (right halfback), and Chester (fullback).

Georgia
The Commodores easily defeated the  Georgia Bulldogs 46–0 in the rain. Coaching the Bulldogs was McGugin product Alex Cunningham. The game was played on the infield and part of the right outfield of Ponce de Leon Park. According to Vanderbilt University Quarterly, the score would have been higher but for the water and mud. Georgia star Bob McWhorter was held in check; his best run went for 12 yards.

The first score of the game came when Wilson Collins got away for a 20-yard run, but fumbled. The ball was picked up by Zach Curlin and run in for a touchdown. When the game ended, Georgia men tried to steal the ball, and a fight broke out, broken up by coach McGugin and umpire Ted Coy.

The starting lineup for Vanderbilt was: Turner (left end), Shipp (left tackle), Daves (left guard), Morgan (center), Huffman (right guard), T. Brown (right tackle), E. Brown (right end), Robins (quarterback), Hardage (left halfback), Shea (right halfback), and Chester (fullback).

Mississippi
Vanderbilt beat Mississippi 24–0, the visitors showing a strong defense. Morgan, Collins, and Sikes were on the sidelines for the whole game. Multiple times, the Commodores fumbled near the goal line.

The starting lineup for Vanderbilt was: Milholland (left end), Shipp (left tackle), Daves (left guard), T. Brown (center), Swafford (right guard), Covington (right tackle), E. Brown (right end), Robins (quarterback), Hardage (left halfback), Shea (right halfback), and Turner (fullback).

Virginia

Sources:

Vanderbilt met Virginia for the first time since 1898. It also won for the first time, 13–0. Ammie Sikes scored first, after runs of 35 and 28 yards by Lew Hardage paved the way. A 30-yard forward pass from Hardage to Enoch Brown got the second touchdown. In the last period, Sikes broke loose, down to the 5-yard line when he was caught from behind by Buck Mayer.

The starting lineup for Vanderbilt was: Turner (left end), Daves (left tackle), Huffman (left guard), Morgan (center), Covington (right guard), T. Brown (right tackle), Milholland (right end), Curlin (quarterback), Hardage (left halfback), Collins (right halfback), and Sikes (fullback).

Harvard

Sources:

Vanderbilt suffered its only loss of the season on the road to coach Percy Haughton's national champion Harvard Crimson 9–3. Only Dartmouth played the Crimson closer. "As usual Harvard tried out the strength of its defense in the first period, kicking usually on the second down." Harvard used mostly substitutes and scored a touchdown five minutes after the second period began. Lew Hardage was injured and taken off the field.

Vanderbilt's lone score was a 28-yard field goal from Zach Curlin early in the third quarter, after Harvard muffed a punt. The Crimson added another field goal in the final period.

In the last ten minutes, the Commodores tried their full repertoire of tricks, including a delayed forward pass in which the ball was handled by four men and netted a 22-yard gain from Rabbi Robins. The International News Service reported: "Although defeated, Vanderbilt was not outplayed; for never was a gamer team seen in the Stadium."

The starting lineup for Vanderbilt was: Turner (left end), Shipp (left tackle), Swafford (left guard), Morgan (center), Daves (right guard), T. Brown (right tackle), E. Brown (right end), Curlin (quarterback), Hardage (left halfback), Collins (right halfback), and Sikes (fullback).

Central University
Vanderbilt playing with just four regulars and a new backfield beat , 23–0. Hardage stayed home in Decatur, Alabama due to an injury.

The starting lineup for Vanderbilt was: Chester (left end), Daves (left tackle), Reyer (left guard), Huffman (center), Swafford (right guard), T. Brown (right tackle), Reams (right end), Robins (quarterback), Luck (left halfback), Shea (right halfback), and Milholland (fullback).

Auburn

Sources:

The Auburn Tigers upset expectations and tied the Commodores 7–7. Ammie Sikes scored first for Vanderbilt. Auburn scored after a Sikes fumble. The ball was kicked some fifteen yards down field clear of the melee, picked up by Kirk Newell, and run 55 yards to the end zone.

The starting lineup for Vanderbilt was: Reams (left end), Shipp (left tackle), Daves (left guard), Moody (center), Covington (right guard), T. Brown (right tackle), E. Brown (right end), Curlin (quarterback), Hardage (left halfback), Collins (right halfback), and Turner (fullback).

Sewanee

Sources:

Vanderbilt defeated rival Sewanee 16–0. In the first period, Sewanee had to punt from its own end zone. The pass to Jenks Gillem went wide, and before he could recover it he was downed by Enoch Brown for a safety. Gillem had one punt of 58 yards that day. Vanderbilt's game seemed to stagnate until Wilson Collins was hurt and replaced by Tom Shea in the third quarter. Then two touchdowns came in the fourth period, one by Robins and another Turner. In his last game, Lew Hardage played well despite his hurt left ankle.

Vanderbilt had clamored for a rematch to decide a champion after its tie with Auburn, but Auburn was upset by Georgia 12–6, meaning Vanderbilt's victory over Sewanee secured the SIAA title.

The starting lineup for Vanderbilt was: Reams (left end), Shipp (left tackle), Daves (left guard), Morgan (center), Swofford (right guard), T. Brown (right tackle), E. Brown (right end), Robins (quarterback), Hardage (left halfback), Collins (right halfback), and Sikes (fullback).

Postseason

Awards and honors
Lew Hardage was selected third-team All-American by Walter Camp, the fourth ever Southern player to get such a recognition. He was a unanimous All-Southern selection. Innis Brown wrote: "Hardage has been rated as probably the most successful man in the south at making forward passes." Ammie Sikes, Hugh Morgan, Tom Brown, and Enoch Brown all made composite All-Southern.

Championships
Vanderbilt won the SIAA title in football, baseball, and track. According to Nathan Stauffer, Texas A&M was Vanderbilt's nearest challenger for best football team in the South.

Personnel

Depth chart
The following chart provides a visual depiction of Vanderbilt's lineup during the 1912 season with games started at the position reflected in parenthesis. The chart mimics a short punt formation while on offense, with the quarterback under center.

Varsity letter winners

The lettermen were dubbed "Wearers of the V." Team manager Frank Gilliland was also a letterman.

See also
1912 College Football All-Southern Team
1912 College Football All-America Team
1912 Southern Intercollegiate Athletic Association football season

Notes

References

Bibliography
 
 
 
 

Vanderbilt
Vanderbilt Commodores football seasons
Vanderbilt Commodores football